Thomas M. Kariuki, is the founding and current Director of the Alliance for Accelerating Excellence in Science in Africa (AESA). The AESA platform was created in 2015 through a partnership of the African Academy of Sciences (AAS), the African Union Development Agency (AUDA-NEPAD),  founding and funding global partners, and through a 2015 resolution of the summit of African Union Heads of Governments. He holds an honorary Professorship at the Liverpool School of Tropical Medicine, a Ph.D. in immunology from the University of York, [2] the presidential Order of Grand Warrior (OGW) for scientific leadership and public service, and is a Fellow of the African Academy of Sciences (FAAS)

Life 

Kariuki grew up in rural Kenya where he witnessed firsthand the benefits of increasing accessibility to science, innovations and basic technologies that can improve and transform lives through education, role models who came from family, school teachers, local and global mentors; many homes in his childhood village did not have electricity or running water, until a decade ago. He notes that the many roads in his home village are still not paved but better governance and infrastructure development of rural roads are shaping many rural lives, putting them on pathways out of poverty. He obtained his undergraduate degree from the University of Nairobi and credits his good education for his latter successes. Kariuki considers education, good health and mentors the greatest gift that a child growing up in Africa can receive.  Through opportunities that came from a mix of decent education, hardwork and serendipity to connect with scientific mentors, Kariuki is an alumnus of the University of Nairobi where he read biosciences, zoology, parasitology and was tutored in immunology by the late Prof Jasper Mumo. He was awarded a Ph.D. in immunology from the University of York under the mentorship of Alan Wilson, titled Vaccination strategies against schistosomes in a primate model. 

He is married with two daughters.

Career 
Kariuki served for seven years as director of the Institute of Primate Research and the National Museums of Kenya , which is a biomedical research and conservation biology centre that is one of a kind in Africa. His research includes the study of infectious diseases, and enabling the development of vaccines, diagnostics, drugs for diseases that affect areas of poverty such as investigating the influence of parasitic/worm infections on vaccination outcomes. His early research work started on bovine immunology at the International Livestock Research Institute (ILRI) which is a CGIAR Nairobi based centre where he was inducted and mentored into immunology by Prof Cynthia Baldwin, who is currently based at UMass, Amherst. He also conducted joint work at IPR and was as a research associate at Case Western Reserve University in Cleveland, Ohio, with their global health team led and mentored by Prof Chris King, focused on the vaccines and diagnostic development for schistosomiasis (Bilharzia), malaria and co-infections.

In 2017 the Liverpool School of Tropical Medicine awarded Kariuki an honorary professorship in recognition of his past and present collaborations with the school, and his efforts to "accelerate world-class research, foster innovation and promote scientific leadership in Africa". Over the years he has collaborated with teams at LSTM, where he has  worked with David Molyneux researching on neglected tropical diseases,  with Imelda Bates who leads the LSTMCapacity Development Unit for the ongoing DELTAS Africa Learning Research Programme; and on the advisory board  andwith the LSTM team led by Rob Harrison working on NTD Snakebite Venom. As part of his continuing role with the African Academy of Sciences, Kariuki  advocates and creates awareness about the importance of science in addressing Africa’s health and development challenges, particularly, the rise of infectious and non-communicable diseases in Africa such as cancer, strokes, diabetes and cardiovascular disease.; “Africa is a young continent. We have the youngest people globally. We don’t know if the rapid growth across the continent is going to be a dividend or a nightmare,”

After nearly two decades in biomedical research as a scientist, Kariuki refocused his efforts into shaping policy and managing global partnership programmes. In January 2015, Kariuki was appointed to lead the Alliance for Accelerating Excellence in Science in Africa (AESA), originally established by the African Academy of Sciences and the African Union Development Agency (AUDA-NEPAD) to shift the centre of gravity for African science to Africa through agenda setting, mobilizing Research & Development (R&D) funding, and managing continent-wide Science, Technology & Innovation (STI) programmes that promote the brightest minds, strengthening the best possible science environments in Africa. AESA also seeks to foster scientific excellence, inspire and mentor emerging research leaders, and to accelerate and translate research and innovations into products, policies and practices that will improve and transform lives in Africa. Over the last five years AESA has mobilized > $300M from global sources and funders to support scientific priorities for Africa to grow the number of its programmes from 2 to the current over 15 and to serve, support and fund over 2,000 scientists in over 40 countries across Africa. The platform is also promoting scientific excellence in a range of disciplines that include health, agriculture, research management, and community and public engagement. Its flagship programme is the Developing Excellence in Leadership, Training and Science (DELTAS Africa) supported by Wellcome and the United Kingdom Foreign, Commonwealth and Development Office (FCDO formerly DFID) to amplify Africa-led development of world-class research and scientific leaders on the continent, while strengthening African institutions. AESA also works in partnership with the Bill & Melinda Gates Foundation and the African Union Development Agency (AUDA-NEPAD) on the programme Grand Challenges Africa, which seeks to catalyse innovations on the continent. In an article written by Kariuki and Steven Buchsbaum, Kariuki comments that “the best way to make life better for Africans is to support great ideas from African innovators.”[9] During his leadership of AESA, the platform has grown to also add other platforms for publishing with AAS Open Research; financial governance with the Global Grant Community; and mobilising support for science with the Coalition for African Research and Innovation (CARI). Portals to provide a platform for innovators to network — the Grand challenges Africa Innovation Network (GCAiN) — and to showcase Africa’s clinical trials capabilities —the Clinical Trials Community, have also marked AESA’s growth respectively.

This transition was not easy, as Kariuki comments “Having created AESA as an agenda setting and funding platform, the shoe is now on the other foot, and I now have to dispense the same narrative and funders’ ethos to my old laboratory bench comrades and hope they will not feel talked down to and estranged like I would occasionally feel when I dealt with funders.”

Kariuki has served the AAS in various roles since he became a fellow of the AAS in 2008. He served as interim director of the African Academy of Sciences in   2017, following his previous role at the AAS as member of the Governing Council/ Treasurer of AAS between 2013–2014.

Kariuki sits on the boards of several international research groups, including the advisory board for the World Health Organization (WHO) technical groups, Coalition for Epidemic Preparedness Innovations (CEPI), LSTM Advisory Board for NTD/Envenoming Group and the Gates Open Research, a platform for publication and open peer review of research funded by the Bill & Melinda Gates Foundation. Here he provides his expertise to shape global programmes and strategies for promoting health and science. He has previously held the position of President of the Federation of African Immunological Societies and served on the Education Committee of the International Union of Immunological Societies. He is also the founder board member of the African Research Network for NTDs (ARNTD).

As part of his role in advocating African science, Kariuki regularly speaks at international conferences including the Women Leaders in Global Health (2020), the World Economic Forum Annual Meeting (2017 and 2019), the Grand Challenges Annual Meeting (2015-2020), the World Health Summit (Innovation for Impact Panel Discussion, 2018) and  the Next Einstein Forum (Learning to lead: what capacities do scientists and researchers of tomorrow need, 2018), amongst others.

You can follow him on his twitter handle: @Afroscientist

Outreach 
Kariuki has spoken about the need to encourage young Africans into science careers given that about 60% of the continent’s population is below 30 years old. His work with AESA addresses some of Africa's most pressing development challenges through capacity building, training, and funding. Writing for ACS Omega, he highlighted the need for Africa to invest in its young people as the continent represents the youngest and fastest growing population. These young people can help provide solutions to the continent’s burden of disease, which is rapidly shifting from communicable to non communicable diseases and other developmental challenges, he wrote. His examples of these development challenges: access to water, climate change and changing weather patterns, food insecurity, and poor infrastructure. Kariuki believes investing in Africa’s young people enables “economic generation, intellectual property, mentorship, and modeling for future generations.”

Awards and honours 

 Fellow of The African Academy of Sciences, 2009
 Senior Fellow of the European Foundation Initiative for Neglected Tropical Diseases
 Order of Grand Warrior of Kenya for Scientific leadership and public service
 Named as Top 10 African Science Heroes in 2016 by the Planet Earth Institute
 Honorary Professorship from the Liverpool School of Tropical Medicine (2017)

Media Coverage Articles 
These are some of the select media articles where Tom Kariuki has been featured.

 L’Opinion: Programme de développement durable : L’engagement des scientifiques africains, 9 Nov 2020
 China.org: Des scientifiques africains s'engagent à soutenir le programme de développement durable, 7 Nov 2020
 Africa Science News: Scientists strengthen the resolve to champion evidence use for development, 6 Nov 2020
 The Cable: Clinical trials: finding a cure for Africans by Africans, 22 Sept 2020
 Conversation Africa: Quality research in Africa matters more than ever – for the whole world, 14 October 2020
 BBC: The Evidence, Reviewing Africa, 15 Apr 2020
 Devex: Crafting a framework for Africa's COVID-19 vaccine access, 26 June 2020
 This Day: Central Research Laboratory Gets World’s First Good Financial Grant Practice Certification, 15 July 2020
 Quartz: African universities are battling to attract post-doctoral researchers, 31 August 2019
 Interpress Service: Kenya: The troubles of a science PhD from the West, 27 August 2019
 University World News: Funders, public key to growing research capacity – Study, 22 February 2019
 Scidev: Q&A: Catalysing investment in innovation, R&D in Africa, 10 May 2018
 Financial Times: Intra-African collaboration is key to global health and local well-being, 9 May 2016
 Quartz: African scientists are fostering a new R&D culture to reverse the continent’s brain drain, 28 Nov 2016
 CNBC: US$7 million to fund innovation in Africa, 17 Nov 2016

References

External links 

 The Alliance for Accelerating Excellence in Science in Africa
 The African Academy of Science

Fellows of the African Academy of Sciences
Living people
1962 births
Kenyan immunologists